Acridocephala variegata is a species of beetle in the family Cerambycidae. It was described by Per Olof Christopher Aurivillius in 1886. It is known from Gabon and Cameroon.

References

Acridocephala
Beetles described in 1886